Annegret Richter (born 13 October 1950) is a German (former West German) athlete and the 1976 Olympic 100 m champion.

Biography
Born Annegret Irrgang, she won her first international title at the 1971 European Championships, as a part of her country's 4×100 m relay team. The next year, at the 1972 Summer Olympics in Munich, she finished 5th in the 100 m, in front of her home crowd. As she had married hurdler Manfred Richter, she now ran under that name. With the relay team, Richter ran a new world record, beating rivals East Germany for the gold.

She took the 60 meter title at the European Indoor Championships in 1973. After taking a bronze in 1971 and a silver in 1972 (over 50 meters).

At the 1974 European Championships in Rome she was again a member of the national 4×100 m relay team, this time winning the silver medal. She was fourth in the 100 metre final.

Before the 1976 Summer Olympics, everybody's attention was not directed at Richter, but at fellow Dortmunder Inge Helten, who had set a new world record of 11.04 just prior to the Games. Richter beat the defending champion Renate Stecher of East Germany in the first round, and ran 11.05 in the second round and set a world record of 11.01 in the semifinals. In the final, Richter, Stecher and Helten finished within one metre of each other, with Richter winning the gold and vanquishing Stecher. Three days later she won a silver medal in the 200 m and another one in the 4×100 m relay, being beaten by East Germany this time.

Richter ran the 3rd leg of the winning relay squad at the first World Cup of Track and Field in 1977, she had the second fastest time of the year for the 100 meters of 11.03. She would finish 3rd in the 100 meters and 4th in the 200 meters at the second World Cup in 1979, again running the 3rd leg of the victorious European relay squad, and retired after the boycott of the 1980 Moscow games. During her career she won 28 national titles. Her daughter Daniela and son Marcus also competed in athletics, at the national level.

See also
 German all-time top lists – 100 metres

References

External links
Annegret Richter at sporting-heroes.net

1950 births
Living people
West German female sprinters
Olympic athletes of West Germany
Athletes (track and field) at the 1972 Summer Olympics
Athletes (track and field) at the 1976 Summer Olympics
Olympic gold medalists for West Germany
Olympic silver medalists for West Germany
Sportspeople from Dortmund
World record setters in athletics (track and field)
European Athletics Championships medalists
Medalists at the 1976 Summer Olympics
Medalists at the 1972 Summer Olympics
Olympic gold medalists in athletics (track and field)
Olympic silver medalists in athletics (track and field)
Olympic female sprinters